The Clove Furnace Ruin in Arden, New York, United States, was a longtime smelting site for iron ore mined from nearby veins in what is now Harriman State Park. It is located on Arden Station Road just east of the New York State Thruway, and can easily be seen from the highway. It was built in 1854 by Robert & Peter Parrott, who also owned and operated  numerous mines in the area, known collectively as the Greenwood Iron Works. Together with the Greenwood Furnace (c.1810), located roughly one half mile east of Clove, these two furnaces produced iron which supplied the Parrott's West Point Foundry at Cold Spring, NY. The foundry produced the famous and highly effective Parrott Rifle (cannon) utilized by the Union army during the Civil War. The furnace shut down permanently, shortly after Robert Parrott's death in 1877.

It is located on Arden, which was formerly a property of Columbia University.

See also
 Southfield Furnace Ruin

References

External links
 Clove Furnace - visiting information

Buildings and structures in Orange County, New York
Columbia University campus
Industrial buildings completed in 1854
1877 disestablishments in New York (state)
Museums in Orange County, New York
1854 establishments in New York (state)